Kesavan's Lamentations (original title: Kesavante Vilapangal) is a 1999 Malayalam novel written by M. Mukundan. The novel tells the story of a writer Kesavan who writes a novel on a child named Appukkuttan who grows under the influence of E. M. S. Namboodiripad.

Plot summary
Written as a story within a story, the book recreates the internal and external chaos involved in the process of Kesavan's writing, as he pens his book, Appukkuttan's Lamentations. The story deals with the life and death of Kesavan as well as with the life and obsessions of the protagonist of Kesavan's book, the boy called Appukkuttan, who deifies E. M. S. Namboodiripad, under whose portrait's gaze he slept and woke as a child. The narrative travels back and forth between Kesavan and Appukkuttan.

Awards
 2003: Vayalar Award - M. Mukundan
 2006: Crossword Book Award for Indian Language Fiction Translation - M. Mukundan and A. J. Thomas for the English translation

Reviews
Citation for the Crossword Book Award by H. S. Shiva Prakash, Subashree Krishnaswamy and Dilip Kumar:

 "Kesavan’s Lamentations is a widely acclaimed work of contemporary fiction in Malayalam, which examines the mystique around E M S Namboodiripad, one of the major icons of Kerala politics. By telescoping divergent narrative positions and techniques in a variety of language registers, Mukundan has created a deeply fascinating novel. Serious and humorous at once, it appeals at different levels to a wide cross-section of readers - an achievement that has earned him the Hutch Crossword Book Award second time around. A J Thomas, well-known translator from Malayalam and an Indian English poet, has recreated successfully in English the resonances and nuances of the source text."

References

1999 novels
1999 Indian novels
Malayalam novels
Novels set in Kerala
Novels by M. Mukundan
DC Books books
Rupa Publications books